Parapiqueria is a genus of Brazilian plants in the tribe Eupatorieae within the family Asteraceae.

Species
The only known species is Parapiqueria cavalcantei, native to the State of Pará in northern Brazil.

References

Eupatorieae
Endemic flora of Brazil
Monotypic Asteraceae genera